Marit Økern Jensen (born 4 April 1938) is a Norwegian orienteering competitor. She is the daughter of Harald Økern.

She competed in the first European Orienteering Championships in 1962, where she won a silver medal in the individual event, and also a silver medal in the unofficial relay event.

National championships
Marit Økern won a total of six gold medals in the Norwegian championships. She received the King's Cup in 1962, 1963 and 1965.

References

1938 births
Living people
Norwegian orienteers
Female orienteers
Foot orienteers
20th-century Norwegian women